Supposed Former Infatuation Junkie is the fourth studio album and second internationally released album by singer-songwriter Alanis Morissette, released by Maverick Records in the United States on November 3, 1998. The album was positively received by critics and performed well commercially, breaking the record for album sales in its first week by a female artist. The first single from the album, "Thank U", reached the top 20 of the US Billboard Hot 100. Morissette promoted the album with worldwide touring.

Inspired from her trip to India over late 1996 and early 1997, the album cover contains phrases from five precepts, a basic code of ethics of the followers of Buddhism.

Background
Morissette wrote "Thank U" and "Baba" after her trip to India in 1997. The protagonist of "Baba" goes on a spiritual pilgrimage to India where she encounters a guru who, like many spiritual teachers in India, is referred to as "Baba". The word "Baba" means "father" in the Hindi language. Morissette opened most of shows during the Junkie era with the song, and it was featured as an opener during her 2002 tours. It has been seldom played since then. "Baba" opened Morissette's performance on the television show MTV Unplugged in 1999, but it was excluded from the CD release Alanis Unplugged. Another live version of "Baba" was released on the No Boundaries: A Benefit for the Kosovar Refugees CD. In a 2012 interview with fans, director Kevin Smith confirmed that "Front Row" was partially inspired by a phone conversation he and Morissette once had. They were mutually attracted to each other but never actually dated. His suggestion of naming the reasons they were not a couple became part of the lyrics.

Critical reception

Supposed Former Infatuation Junkie was acclaimed by music critics. Stephen Thomas Erlewine from AllMusic called it a "clear step forward" and concluded that "Morissette is a weird acquired taste, due to her idiosyncratic vocals and doggedly convoluted confessionals – but [the album] certainly confirms that she doesn't quite sound like anyone else, either." The Village Voices Robert Christgau commented that he felt "privileged to listen along with all the young women whose struggles Morissette blows up to such a scale." Ken Tucker from Entertainment Weekly complimented Morissette's new style and wrote that "Morissette has used her year-plus recording hiatus and newfound star status wisely, in pursuit of a way to make a vulnerable, openhearted album in the face of intense commercial expectations." Slant Magazine critic Sal Cinquemani complimented Morissette's songwriting and concluded that while the album "is nearly 15 minutes too long (did an ode to her mother, the sweet 'Heart of the House,' really need to be made public?)... not one moment of Junkies 70-plus minutes is less than captivating."

Despite the B+ grade from Ken Tucker in 1998, fellow Entertainment Weekly music critic David Browne was much harsher. In the Spring 2000 Tenth Anniversary issue of Entertainment Weekly, in a retrospective article discussing popular music in the 1990s, Browne wrote "Musically speaking, easy targets abounded--does anyone beyond family remember Hammer's gangsta makeover or Vanilla Ice's live album? At least we could laugh at those, whereas the decade's foremost clunker--Alanis Morisette's Supposed Former Infatuation Junkie--was corporate grunge and victim-culture whining incarnate." It was also listed amongst "the worst albums ever" by Q magazine.

Commercial performance
In the United States, Supposed Former Infatuation Junkie debuted at number one on the Billboard 200 with 469,000 copies sold in its first week. The album broke the record for sales in its first week by a female act, surpassing Lauryn Hill's The Miseducation of Lauryn Hill which opened with 423,000 copies. This would be later surpassed once again in 2000 by Britney Spears with the release of her second album Oops!...I Did It Again selling 1.3 million copies in its first week. In the New Zealand Albums Chart, it was Morissette's second consecutive number one album, and was certificated 2× Platinum by RIANZ, selling over 30,000 copies. The album also debuted at number one in Switzerland, and stayed in the charts for thirty-one weeks. It was certified Platinum in that country. The album entered at number one in Norway, staying there for three weeks. It was certificated platinum there as well. It also peaked in the top ten in many countries, including the United Kingdom, Australia, France, Sweden, and other European countries. The album has sold 2,604,000 copies in the United States as of March 2012.
The album sold 2.2 million copies worldwide on its first week of release and over 5.2 million copies worldwide within a month.

Accolades
"Thank U" received a Grammy Award nomination for Best Female Pop Vocal Performance, and "So Pure" was nominated in the category of Best Female Rock Vocal Performance.

The album itself won a Juno Award for Album of the Year. The third single So Pure won the award for Best Video.

Promotion
As with the previous album, Morissette did an extensive amount of touring in support for this record. In the fall of 1998, she embarked on a club tour across North America with select appearances in Europe, Asia and Australia. The North American leg of the tour included opening act Chris Whitley.

Guitarist Nick Lashley and bassist Chris Chaney remained for this album's touring from the previous years, although there were several new band members. The band now incorporated a keyboardist, Deron Johnson, and welcomed guitarist Joel Shearer (from the Jagged Little Pill recording sessions) and drummer Gary Novak. Morissette herself continued playing guitar (however more so than previous tours) and harmonica. She also started playing the flute in concerts, during the song "That I Would Be Good".

In January 1999, "The Junkie Tour" kicked off, and lasted through July, then returned in October up until the end of December. Opening acts included Garbage and Liz Phair, among others. The worldwide tour had alternating setlists for every leg, but included the usual set openers and closers. The concert introduction music was a track from DJ Shadow, entitled "Building Steam with a Grain of Salt".

During the tour, Morissette wrote the song "Still" for the Kevin Smith film, Dogma. This song was performed live for the first time in July at Morissette's VH1 Storytellers special. After that special, she performed in front of thousands during the Woodstock '99 concert festival in New York. Unlike the previous tours, Morissette focused mainly on performing songs that had been released and didn't perform any new songs, aside from a couple of B-sides during the second half of the year.

In May, Morissette and Tori Amos announced the "5 Week Tour" which filled the touring void in August and September before "The Junkie Tour" re-commenced. The tour would be a joint venture, as they both co-headlined the bills. Toward the end of the tour, Morissette recorded her MTV Unplugged concert special. During the final weeks of "The Junkie Tour", keyboardist Deron Johnson left the band and was replaced, and Gary Novak took a temporary leave and was replaced as well.

Morissette announced a summer tour in 2000 called "The One Tour" which kicked off with two dates in North America, before continuing in places she had never toured (or rarely toured) before across Europe and parts of Asia. In each city, she selected an ambassador through a website contest on "Z.com", to show her around and teach her the culture. It was after this tour that Morissette kicked off MSN and DirecTV's concert series, Music in High Places where she performed acoustic on the Navajo Nation in Arizona, and also learned the cultures, practices, traditions and songs from the natives in the area. This was Morissette's final performance and release that tied into promotion for Supposed Former Infatuation Junkie before she started writing her follow-up, Under Rug Swept.

Singles
The first single from Supposed Former Infatuation Junkie, "Thank U", was released to US radio in October 1998. It charted considerably high in initial airplay because of the anticipation for the album, but many critics and listeners who had pigeonholed Morissette as an angry woman were surprised by the song's calm and serene feel. Released in November, the album debuted at number one on the US Billboard 200 with the highest first-week sales for a female artist at the time, selling 469,054 copies in its first seven days. She held this record for two years, until being outsold in first week sales by Britney Spears' Oops!...I Did It Again which sold 1.3 million copies in 2000. It held the number-one spot for an additional week, before falling to eighth place in what is generally a busy shopping period because of the holiday season. Over the next few weeks sales for the album slowly declined, and then faltered drastically. After 28 weeks, the album had fallen off the Billboard 200, and as of September 2008 it had sold 2.6 million copies in the US, less than a fifth in sales of that of Jagged Little Pill.

Though not an official single release in the US, "Joining You" became a modest hit on the Modern Rock Tracks chart; it was released as the album's second single in the UK and Europe. "Unsent", the second US single, peaked outside the top 40 on the US Billboard Hot 100. The third single "So Pure" made the top 40 in the UK as well as certain airplay charts in the US, though not the Billboard Hot 100. None of the singles revived significant interest in the album.

Track listing

Personnel

Alanis Morissette – flute, harmonica, piano, vocals, producer, photography
Glen Ballard – synthesizer, guitar, piano, programming, producer, engineer, string arrangements
Benmont Tench – organ, chamberlin
David Campbell – string arrangements
Scott Campbell	– engineer
Gary Novak – percussion, drums
Joel Shearer – guitar
Jolie Levine – production coordination
Nick Lashley – guitar
Chris Bellman – mastering
Chris Fogel – programming, engineer, mixing
Kevin Reagan – art direction, design
Roger Sommers – engineer, second engineer
Dash Mihok	– photography, loop
Regina Thomas – photography
Chris Chaney – bass guitar
Stefan G. Bucher – design
Shad T. Scott – programming
Heather Stanley – photography

Charts

Weekly charts

Year-end charts

Certifications

Notes

References

1998 albums
Alanis Morissette albums
Maverick Records albums
Albums arranged by David Campbell (composer)
Albums produced by Glen Ballard
Juno Award for Album of the Year albums